Wandoo National Park is a national park in Western Australia, 80 km east of Perth. It was established in 2004, and has an area of 463.68 km2.

References

External link
 Wandoo National Park, Parks and Wildlife Service

National parks of Western Australia
Jarrah Forest
Protected areas established in 2004
2004 establishments in Australia